Tazehabad (also Romanized as Tāzehābād) is a village in Mazraeh-ye Jonubi Rural District, Voshmgir District, Aqqala County, Golestan Province, Iran. At the 2006 census, its population was 309, in 75 families.

References 

Populated places in Aqqala County